Tulsa is a hub of art deco and contemporary architecture, and most buildings of Tulsa are in either of these two styles. Prominent buildings include the BOK Tower, the second tallest building in Oklahoma; the futurist Oral Roberts University campus and adjacent Cityplex Towers, a group of towers that includes the third tallest building in Oklahoma; Boston Avenue Methodist Church, an Art Deco church designated as a National Historic Landmark; and the BOK Center, an 18,000 seat arena in downtown Tulsa.

Skyscrapers and highrises

Auditoriums, arenas, and theaters

References

Source:

See also
Tulsa, Oklahoma
National Register of Historic Places listings in Oklahoma
List of Art Deco buildings in Tulsa, Oklahoma